is a Japanese life scientist specializing in biochemistry and epigenetics. He is a Professor Emeritus at University of Tokyo and a former Guest Senior Researcher at Waseda University.

Biography 
He graduated from Kagoshima Prefectural Konan High School in 1969 and from Department of Veterinary Sciences, Faculty of Agriculture, University of Miyazaki in 1973. In 1979, he completed Department of Veterinary Medical Sciences, Graduate School of Agriculture, University of Tokyo and got Ph.D. in Agriculture. After he completed the graduate school, he joined the Takeda Pharmaceutical Company. In 1987, He retired the company and became an Associate Professor at University of Tokyo Graduate School of Agricultural and Life Sciences (Department of Animal Resource Sciences and Department of Veterinary Medical Sciences). He received the Japanese Society of Veterinary Science Award for 1996.

He became a Professor at University of Tokyo Graduate School of Agricultural and Life Sciences (Department of Animal Resource Sciences and Department of Veterinary Medical Sciences) in 1998. He also served as adjunct professors at National Institute of Genetics, Juntendo University and Kagoshima University. In 2013, Kunio Shiota and Koji Hayakawa's research team at University of Tokyo succeeded in the generation of orexin neurons from pluripotent stem cells (mouse embryonic stem cells) for the first time in the world.

In 2016, he was given the title of Professor Emeritus at University of Tokyo and became a Guest Senior Researcher at Waseda University Research Institute for Science and Engineering.

References 

1950 births
Living people
Japanese biochemists
Academic staff of the University of Tokyo
University of Miyazaki alumni
University of Tokyo alumni